Skarszewo may refer to the following places:
Skarszewo, Kuyavian-Pomeranian Voivodeship (north-central Poland)
Skarszewo, Człuchów County in Pomeranian Voivodeship (north Poland)
Skarszewo, Lębork County in Pomeranian Voivodeship (north Poland)
Skarszewo, Warmian-Masurian Voivodeship (north Poland)